Østre Agder is a district or region in Agder county in southern Norway. The district covers the eastern, coastal areas of the county including the eight municipalities of Arendal, Tvedestrand, Risør, Grimstad, Gjerstad, Vegårshei, Åmli, and Froland.  The city of Arendal is the largest city in the region.  Other cities in the district include Tvedestrand, Grimstad, and Risør.  This region is bounded by Telemark county to the north, by the Setesdal region to the northwest, and by the Kristiansand Region to the southwest.  

Østre Agder has about 92,400 residents in its  area.  The Aust-Agder District Court is the court system that covers all of Østre Agder.  The district includes all of the Church of Norway deaneries of Aust-Nedenes prosti (Gjerstad, Vegårshei, Åmli, Tvedestrand, and Risør) and Arendal prosti (Arendal and Froland) as well as a part of the Vest-Nedenes prosti (Grimstad).

Municipalities 
The Østre Agder Region includes the following municipalities:

References

Regions of Norway
Districts of Agder
Arendal
Grimstad
Risør
Tvedestrand
Froland
Åmli
Gjerstad
Vegårshei